Sbia or SBIA may refer to:

 An ancient city in Tunisia that some have identified as Mahdia
 San Bernardino International Airport
 Simón Bolívar International Airport (Colombia)
 Simón Bolívar International Airport (Venezuela)
 Subic Bay International Airport
 Suvarnabhumi Airport, also known as (New) Bangkok International Airport, BKK